Kate Quigley is an American comedian, actress and model. She hosted Playboy TV’s Undercover and the 2016 AVN Awards. She has appeared as a headlining comedian at the Improv, Laugh Factory, Ice House Comedy Club, Comedy Store, and Haha Comedy Club in Hollywood.

Life
Quigley grew up in Canton, Ohio.  After graduating high school, she left home to study theater at Roosevelt University's Chicago College of Performing Arts.

On September 4, 2021, Quigley was hospitalized in Los Angeles after suffering from an overdose of cocaine laced with fentanyl. Three of her companions, comedian Fuquan Johnson, Natalie Williamson, and Enrico Colangeli, also overdosed and died.

Credits
 Guber (2016)
 My Super-Overactive Imagination (2013–15) 
 Star Trek: Hidden Frontier (2006)
 The Office (2006)

References

External links
 

Living people
American stand-up comedians
Comedians from California
Actresses from California
Female models from California
21st-century American actresses
Actors from Canton, Ohio
Comedians from Ohio
Actresses from Ohio
Female models from Ohio
21st-century American comedians
1982 births